Fleetwood is an English surname. Notable people with the surname include:

 Adam Fleetwood, British racing driver
 Charles Fleetwood (died 1692), English Parliamentary General and Lord Deputy of Ireland
 Charles Fleetwood (theatre manager) (died 1747), manager of the Theatre Royal, Drury Lane
 Christian Fleetwood (1840–1914), American army officer
 Daniel M. Fleetwood (born 1958), American engineer
 Folke Fleetwood (1890–1949), Swedish Olympic discus thrower
 Francis Fleetwood (1946-2015), American architect
 Frederick G. Fleetwood (1868-1938), U.S. politician, representative from Vermont
 Sir George Fleetwood (regicide), English soldier, signatory of King Charles I's death warrant
 George Fleetwood (disambiguation), several people
 Gerard Fleetwood (before 1604 – after 1650), member of the House of Commons of England
 Henry Fleetwood (disambiguation), several people
 Hugh Fleetwood (born 1944), British writer and painter
 James Fleetwood (1603–1683), Bishop of Worcester
 John Fleetwood (disambiguation), several people
 Marquel Fleetwood (born 1970), American football player
 Mick Fleetwood, drummer for rock band Fleetwood Mac
 Miles Fleetwood (died 1641), member of the House of Commons of England
 Nicole R. Fleetwood, professor of American Studies and Art History at Rutgers University
 Richard Fleetwood (1653–1709), member of the House of Commons of England for Lancashire (1704–1705)
 Roy Fleetwood (born 1946), British architect and designer
 Sara Iredell Fleetwood (1849–1908), American nurse and clubwoman
 Steve Fleetwood (born 1962), English football player and manager
 Stuart Fleetwood, Welsh footballer
 Susan Fleetwood (1944-1995), English actor, sister of Mick Fleetwood
 Thomas Fleetwood (disambiguation), several people
 Tommy Fleetwood (born 1991), English golfer
 Victoria Fleetwood (born 1990), English rugby union player
 William Fleetwood (disambiguation), several people
 Chuck Fleetwood-Smith (1908–1971), Australian cricketer
 Bernard Fleetwood-Walker (1893–1965), English artist
 Sir Peter Hesketh-Fleetwood (1801-1866), English landowner and MP, founder of Fleetwood, Lancashire, England

English-language surnames